Costitachys is a genus of ground beetles in the family Carabidae. There are at least two described species in Costitachys.

Species
These two species belong to the genus Costitachys:
 Costitachys inusitatus Erwin, 1974  (Brazil)
 Costitachys tena Erwin & Kavanaugh, 2007

References

Trechinae
Taxa named by Terry Erwin